Gurudas College, established in 1956,14 August; is an undergraduate college in Kolkata, West Bengal, India. It is affiliated with the University of Calcutta. The name commemorates the legacy of Sir Gurudas Banerjee, the first Indian vice-chancellor of the University of Calcutta.

Departments

Science
Chemistry
Physics
Mathematics
Statistics
Zoology
Botany
Computer Science
Microbiology 
Economics
Bio-chemistry

Arts and Commerce
Bengali
English
Sanskrit
History
Political Science
Philosophy
Economics
Journalism & Mass communication
Commerce

Accreditation
Gurudas College is recognized by the University Grants Commission (UGC). It was re-accredited and awarded B grade by the National Assessment and Accreditation Council (NAAC).

See also 
List of colleges affiliated to the University of Calcutta
Education in India
Education in West Bengal

References

External links
Gurudas College website

Educational institutions established in 1956
University of Calcutta affiliates
Universities and colleges in Kolkata
1956 establishments in West Bengal